The 1988 Hall of Fame Tennis Championships and the 1988 Virginia Slims of Newport were tennis tournaments played on grass courts at the International Tennis Hall of Fame in Newport, Rhode Island, in the United States that were part of the 1988 Nabisco Grand Prix and of the Category 3 tier of the 1988 WTA Tour. The men's tournament was held from July 4 through July 10, 1988, while the women's tournament was held from July 11 through July 17, 1988.

Finals

Men's singles
 Wally Masur defeated  Brad Drewett 6–2, 6–1
 It was Masur's 1st title of the year and the 9th of his career.

Women's singles

 Lori McNeil defeated  Barbara Potter 6–4, 4–6, 6–3
 It was McNeil's 6th title of the year and the 16th of her career.

Men's doubles
 Kelly Jones /  Peter Lundgren defeated  Scott Davis /  Dan Goldie 6–3, 7–6
 It was Jones' only title of the year and the 2nd of his career. It was Lundgren's only title of the year and the 5th of his career.

Women's doubles

 Rosalyn Fairbank /  Barbara Potter defeated  Gigi Fernández /  Lori McNeil 6–4, 6–3
 It was Fairbank's 1st title of the year and the 16th of her career. It was Potter's 1st title of the year and the 22nd of her career.

External links
 Official website
 ATP Tournament Profile

Hall of Fame Tennis Championships
Virginia Slims of Newport
Hall of Fame Open
Virginia Slims of Newport
 
Hall of Fame Tennis Championships
Tennis tournaments in Rhode Island
Hall of Fame Tennis Championships
Hall of Fame Tennis Championships